Davy Brouwers (born 3 February 1988) is a Belgian footballer who currently plays for Patro Eisden in the Belgian First Amateur Division as a right winger.

Statistics

External links
 Voetbal International profile 
 

1988 births
Living people
Belgian footballers
Belgian expatriate footballers
K. Patro Eisden Maasmechelen players
Lommel S.K. players
Helmond Sport players
MVV Maastricht players
K.S.V. Roeselare players
Eerste Divisie players
Challenger Pro League players
Belgian Third Division players
Association football midfielders
Expatriate footballers in the Netherlands
Belgian expatriate sportspeople in the Netherlands
K.V.V. Thes Sport Tessenderlo players
Sportspeople from Genk
Footballers from Limburg (Belgium)